Gianluca Mancini (born 17 April 1996) is an Italian footballer who plays as a centre-back for Serie A club Roma and the Italy national team.

Club career

Perugia
Mancini left for Perugia on loan in mid–2015, with an option to purchase. Mancini made his professional debut in the Serie B for Perugia on 11 September 2015 in a game against Pescara.

After a brief return to Florence, by the club excising the counter-option. on 1 August 2016, Fiorentina announced that they had sold Mancini to Perugia outright for free. It was later revealed that Fiorentina was eligible to 50% future transfer fee.

Atalanta
In January 2017, Mancini and Alessandro Santopadre, son of Massimiliano Santopadre, chairman of Perugia, were signed by Atalanta for €200,000 and €1 million transfer fees respectively. They were immediately loaned back to Perugia from Atalanta. The deal was later accused by the prosecutor as a manipulation of transfer fees, which overstated the price-tag of Santopadre and understated Mancini. The chairman and both clubs were acquitted of any wrongdoing in July 2018.

Mancini made his Serie A debut in a 1–1 draw against his former team Fiorentina, replacing Rafael Toloi after 25 minutes.

On 4 February 2018, he scored his first goal in a 1–0 for Atalanta against Chievo in Serie A.

Roma
On 17 July 2019, Mancini joined Roma on loan with a conditional obligation to buy for €13 million plus bonuses and a 10 per cent sell on fee.

International career
On 1 September 2017, Mancini made his international debut with the Italy U21 team in a 3–0 friendly loss against Spain.

On 15 March 2019, Gianluca Mancini received a call up from Roberto Mancini for Italy's UEFA Euro 2020 qualifying matches against Finland and Liechtenstein. On 26 March, he made his senior international debut in a 6–0 home win over Liechtenstein.

He took part in the 2019 UEFA European Under-21 Championship.

Style of play
Mancini is a tall and physically strong central defender capable of playing in both a three or a four-man defensive line. Among his strengths are his excellent heading ability, which makes him a likely goal threat in the opposition's penalty box. Besides his regular position, he can also play as a right–sided full-back and a defensive midfielder, mainly out of necessity. He has cited Marco Materazzi as his favourite defender of all time.

Personal life 
Married to Elisa, the couple has two daughters.

Career statistics

Club

International

Honours
Roma
UEFA Europa Conference League: 2021–22

Individual
UEFA Europa League Squad of the Season: 2020–21

References

External links
 Profile at the A.S. Roma website
 
 
 FIGC Profile 

1996 births
Living people
People from Pontedera
Sportspeople from the Province of Pisa
Association football central defenders
Italian footballers
Italy under-21 international footballers
A.C. Perugia Calcio players
Atalanta B.C. players
A.S. Roma players
Serie B players
Serie A players
Italy international footballers
UEFA Europa Conference League winning players
Footballers from Tuscany